Perchau am Sattel is a former municipality in the district of Murau in the Austrian state of Styria. Since the 2015 Styria municipal structural reform, it is part of the municipality Neumarkt in der Steiermark.

Geography
Perchau lies about 22 km east of Murau.

References

Cities and towns in Murau District